The 1922 Presbyterian Blue Hose football team represented Presbyterian College as a member of the Southern Intercollegiate Athletic Association (SIAA) during the 1922 college football season. Led by seventh-year head coach Walter A. Johnson, Presbyterian  compiled an overall record of 6–2–1 with a mark of 2–0 in SIAA play. The team captain was J. B. Clowney.

Schedule

References

Presbyterian
Presbyterian Blue Hose football seasons
Presbyterian Blue Hose football